Some Mad Hope is the sixth studio album by American singer-songwriter Matt Nathanson, released on August 14, 2007, on Vanguard Records. It peaked on the Billboard 200 at #60, and peaked at 3 on the Top Independent Albums. Some Mad Hope was Nathanson's first album for Vanguard Records, and contained two singles that became AAA airplay staples, "Car Crash" and "Come On Get Higher". In September 2008, Vanguard Records announced "All We Are" and "To the Beat of Our Noisy Hearts" as future singles.  The city skyline that's featured on the album's cover is that of Los Angeles.

As of August 2016, the album has sold 500,000 copies. Come On Get Higher was certified 2x Multi-Platinum on September 16, 2016.

The "Car Crash" song is also a sample song on Philips GoGear RaGa.

Track listing

Personnel
 Matt Nathanson – vocals, guitar
 John Thomasson – electric and string bass
 Aaron Tap – guitar
 Jason McGerr – drums, percussion (tracks 2, 4, 7, 8, 12)
 Jason McKenzie – drums, percussion (tracks 1, 3, 5, 9, 10, 11)
 Jim McGorman – guitar (tracks 1, 3, 5, 9, 11), keys (3, 5, 11), background vocals on track 1
 Michael Chaves – guitar (tracks 2, 4, 7, 8, 10, 12)
 Ben West – piano, keys (tracks 2, 4, 6, 7, 8, 12)
 Suzie McNeil – background vocals on tracks 6 & 11
 Marshall Altman – percussion, background vocals (tracks 3, 4, 5, 7, 8, 9, 10, 11, 12)
 Mark Weinberg – electric guitar (tracks 9 & 10)

References

2007 albums
Matt Nathanson albums
Albums produced by Marshall Altman
Vanguard Records albums